Anatoly Petrov may refer to:
 Anatoly Petrov (athlete)
 Anatoly Petrov (animator)